This is a list of swing and Western swing musicians.

Swing 
 Anita O'Day (1919–2006)
 Art Tatum (1909–1956)
 Artie Shaw (1910–2004)
 Ben Webster (1909–1973)
 Benny Carter (1907–2003)
 Benny Goodman (1909–1986)
 Bill Doggett (1916–1996)
 Billie Holiday (1915–1959)
 Buck Clayton (1911–1991)
 Buddy Rich (1917–1987)
 Bunny Berigan (1908–1942)
 Cab Calloway (1907–1994)
 Charlie Barnet (1913–1991)
 Charlie Christian (1918–1942)
 Chick Webb (1905–1939)
 Chu Berry (1908–1941)
 Cliff Townshend (1917–1986)
 Coleman Hawkins (1904–1969)
 Count Basie (1904–1984)
 Cozy Cole (1909–1981)
 Craig Ball (1909–1960)
 Doc Severinsen (1927–)
 Don Byas (1912–1972)
 Don Redman (1900–1964)
 Django Reinhardt (1910–1953)
 Duke Ellington (1899–1974)
 Earl Hines (1903–1983)
 Ella Fitzgerald (1917–1996)
 Fats Waller  (1904–1943)
 Fletcher Henderson (1897–1952)
 Frank Sinatra (1915–1998)
 Freddie Green (1911–1987)
 Gene Krupa (1909–1973)
 George Duvivier (1920–1985)
 George Paxton
 Glenn Miller (1904–1944)
 Hank Jones (1918–2010)
 Harry James (1916–1983)
 Illinois Jacquet (1922–2004)
 Ilse Huizinga (1966–)
 J.C. Heard (1911–1985)
 Jack Teagarden (1905–1964)
 Jean Goldkette (1893–1962)
 Jimmy Dorsey (1904–1957)
 Jimmy Rushing (1902–1972)
 Jo Jones (1911–1985)
 Johnny Hodges (1906–1970)
 Lester Young (1909–1959)
 Lionel Hampton (1908–2002)
 Louie Bellson (1924–2009)
 Louis Armstrong (1901–1971)
 Midge Williams (1915–1952)
 Milt Hinton (1910–2000)
 Nat King Cole (1919–1965)
 Roy Eldridge (1911–1989)
 Sammy Kaye (1910–1987)
 Slim Gaillard (1916–1991)
 Sonny Greer (1895–1982)
 Stéphane Grappelli (1908–1997)
 Sun Ra (1934–1993)
 Sweets Edison (1915–1999)
 Ted Heath (1902–1969)
 Teddy Wilson (1912–1986)
 The Squadronaires (1939–)
 Tommy Dorsey (1905–1956)
 Woody Herman (1913–1987)

Western swing 
 Adolph Hofner (1932–1993)
 Bob Wills & His Texas Playboys (1905–1975)
 Cecil Brower (1914–1965)
 Chet Atkins (1942–1996)
 Chubby Wise (1915–1996)
 Cliff Bruner (1915–2000)
 Hank Penny (1918–1992)
 Hank Thompson, (1946–2007)
 Johnny Gimble (1938–2015)
 Johnnie Lee Wills (1912–1984)
 Leon McAuliffe (1917–1988)
 Light Crust Doughboys (1931–)
 Mart Kenney (1910–2006)
 Milton Brown (1903–1936)
 Moon Mullican (1909–1967)
 Pee Wee King (1914–2000)
 Sheb Wooley (1945–1999)
 Spade Cooley (1910–1969)
 Tex Williams (1917–1985)
 Tommy Allsup (1931–2017)
 Tommy Duncan (1911–1967)

Swing revival groups (post-1960)
 Asleep at the Wheel (1970–)
 Big Sandy & His Fly-Rite Boys (1990–)
 Big Bad Voodoo Daddy (1989–)
 Clint Black (1983–)
 Buster Poindexter (1987–)
 Cherry Poppin' Daddies (1989–)
 Commander Cody and His Lost Planet Airmen (1967–1976)
 Ray Gelato (1982–)
 Dan Hicks (1965–2016)
 The Dusty Chaps (1969–1980s)
 Hot Club of Cowtown (1997–)
 Lyle Lovett (1980–)
 Michael Bublé (1975–)
 The Quebe Sisters Band (2000–)
 Riders in the Sky (1977–)
 Shoot Low Sheriff (2008–)
 Squirrel Nut Zippers (1996–2018)

References

Musicians
Swing